Flinders Highway connects the South Australian towns of Ceduna and Port Lincoln, a distance of  Flinders Highway - along with Lincoln Highway - presents an alternative but somewhat longer coastal route between Ceduna and Port Augusta, compared to the more direct route along Eyre Highway. It is designated route B100.

Route

Flinders Highway runs parallel to the western coast of the Eyre Peninsula through undulating farmland. It is named after the explorer Matthew Flinders who sighted these coasts in early 1802 from HMS Investigator. Only small settlements lie along its track: of these, Coffin Bay is a centre for oyster farming, Elliston is renowned for swimming beaches and fishing and Ceduna is the main town on the far west coast of South Australia supporting government offices and businesses.

History
The South Australian government decreed "the road from Port Lincoln to Streaky Bay will be known as the Flinders Highway", taking effect on 1 July 1938.

Major junctions

References

See also

 Highways in Australia
 List of highways in South Australia

Highways in South Australia
Eyre Peninsula